The Delaware and Hudson Railroad Freight House is a historic railroad building located at Cohoes, Albany County, New York. The freight house was built in 1910 by the Delaware and Hudson Railway. It is a one-story, rectangular brick building on a raised, battered concrete basement.

It was added to the National Register of Historic Places on February 20, 1998.

See also
National Register of Historic Places listings in Albany County, New York

References

Railway freight houses on the National Register of Historic Places in New York (state)
Transport infrastructure completed in 1910
Cohoes, New York
National Register of Historic Places in Albany County, New York
Transportation buildings and structures in Albany County, New York